Elliot Ewen Pasione Ikilei (born 25 June 1977) is a New Zealand politician. He is a member of the New Conservative Party and has contested two general elections without success. He was the New Conservative Party's deputy leader from 2017 to 2020, and as its leader for six weeks in 2020 before announcing on 31 December that he had resigned the leadership.

Personal life and career outside of politics
Elliot Ikilei was born on 25 June 1977 and grew up in the Auckland suburbs of Point England, Glen Innes, and Mount Wellington. He spent his teenage years in Hamilton. According to Ikilei, he struggled with drug and alcohol addiction during his youth before undergoing a "born again" experience and converting to Christianity at the age of 25.

Ikilei has worked as a youth worker in Auckland's Flat Bush and Botany Downs suburbs. Ikilei currently lives in Papakura in South Auckland. He is married to Eona, a Singaporean, and the couple have two children named Jeslyn and Eli.

Political activity

2017 general election
During the lead-up to the 2017 general election, Elliott Ikilei had been designated as the Conservative candidate for a cross-party debate in March 2017 organised by the University of Auckland's Debating Society. However, the Conservatives were uninvited when the society decided to limit participants to parties that were represented in the New Zealand Parliament. At a subsequent debate held at the University of Auckland, Ikilei advocated government prohibitions of abortion and supported citizen-initiated referendums.

In June 2017, Ikilei was appointed as the Conservative Party's deputy leader and nominated as the party's candidate for the Manurewa electorate; he won 342 votes and came last of six candidates. The Conservatives overall performed poorly during the election, winning only 0.2% of the party vote (6,253 votes) and did not win any seats in Parliament.

Activity between elections
After the Conservatives rebranded themselves as the New Conservatives, Ikilei defended controversial far-right Canadians Lauren Southern and Stefan Molyneux, who had been denied public speaking venues during their tour of Auckland in July 2018. In August 2018, Ikilei seconded former National and ACT parties leader Don Brash during a debate on free speech and "political correctness" at the University of Auckland, which attracted the attention of protesters.

In October 2018, Ikilei was designated as the party's candidate for the scheduled Botany by-election, triggered by Jami-Lee Ross' resignation from the National Party. However, the by-election did not go ahead since Ross opted to remain in Parliament as an independent candidate.

During the COVID-19 pandemic in New Zealand, Ikilei attended an anti-lockdown "liberty march" in Auckland's Queen Street, which attracted hundreds of demonstrators including Advance New Zealand party co-leader Jami-Lee Ross.

2020 general election 
In April 2020, the New Conservative Party announced Ikilei as their candidate for the 2020 New Zealand general election for the new electorate of Takanini (at the time proposed to be called "Flat Bush") that had been created following population changes. He campaigned on increasing support for neighbourhood police teams in Takanini and improving local road infrastructure.

At the election, held on 17 October, Ikilei came fourth in Takinini with 939 votes. The New Conservatives received 1.5% of the party vote (42,615 votes), below the five percent threshold needed to enter Parliament. As such, Ikelei again did not enter Parliament.

Following the election results, Ikilei said that the party would be contest the next general election scheduled for 2023. Ikilei attributed the party's failure to enter Parliament to factors including insufficient media coverage of minor parties and shortcomings in the New Conservative's campaign messaging such as their Māori language policies.

Leadership of the party 
In November 2020, the party's board voted for Ikelei to be its leader, replacing Leighton Baker. Ikelei said that there would not be significant changes to the party's policy, but he would be taking a "more aggressive and confrontational approach to presentation style." 

On 31 December, six weeks into the role, Ikilei announced his resignation as leader on Twitter.

Political views
Ikilei is socially conservative, opposing abortion, supporting cannabis prohibition and taking a traditional stance on family, law and order, and welfare. In April 2019, Ikilei was temporarily suspended from Twitter for tweeting "'Trans women' are men with dysphoria/disorder, to be treated with compassion and tolerance"; a remark condemned by many as transphobic. Ikilei has defended controversial Australian rugby player Israel Folau's opposition to homosexuality.

Ikilei has described free speech as a cornerstone of Western culture. He has also advocated "tough on crime" policies and opposed Māori seats. In August 2019, Ikilei welcomed a deal between the Māori tribe Te Kawerau ā Maki and Fletcher Building over the Ihumātao land dispute. He has also criticised China's Hong Kong national security law.

References

External links
New Conservatives profile
Elliot Ikilei's LinkedIn profile

1977 births
Living people
New Conservative Party (New Zealand) politicians
Leaders of political parties in New Zealand
New Zealand Christians
Unsuccessful candidates in the 2017 New Zealand general election
Unsuccessful candidates in the 2020 New Zealand general election
New Zealand people of Niuean descent
New Zealand people of Māori descent
New Zealand people of Tongan descent